Eletise Leafa Vitale is the son of Women's Affairs Minister Leafa Vitale who along with former Communications Minister Toi Aukuso conspired to assassinate the Prime Minister Tuilaepa Aiono Sailele Malielegaoi, the Chief Justice, the Minister of Justice, and New Zealand's High Commissioner to Samoa.

On the night of 16 July 1999 during celebrations of the 20th anniversary of the ruling Human Rights Protection Party he shot the Minister of Works Luagalau Levaula Kamu in the back. He pleaded guilty to murder and was sentenced to death by hanging on 6 August 1999 by Justice Andrew Wilson. His death sentence was commuted to life imprisonment by the head of state.

Vitale was granted parole in 2010, but rearrested for breach of parole in 2019.

References

Samoan prisoners sentenced to death
Prisoners sentenced to death by Samoa
Samoan people convicted of murder
People convicted of murder by Samoa
Living people
Year of birth missing (living people)